The 1955 SCCA National Sports Car Championship season was the fifth season of the Sports Car Club of America's National Sports Car Championship. It began February 27, 1955, and ended November 13, 1955, after fourteen races.

Schedule

 Feature race

Season results
Feature race overall winners in bold.

 Modified & Production classes were classified together at Pebble Beach
 G Production were classified with F Production at Cumberland
 An unrestricted class ran with B Modified, and was won by John Meyer in a Meyer-Cadillac Special.
 A separate race for the fastest 10 drivers of the weekend was also held, won by John Gordon Bennett in a D Modified-class Maserati 300S.
 Jaguar XKMs were classified separately from others in C Production at Thompson.
 Separate Overall and Austin-Healey winners were declared in D Production at Thompson and Hagerstown.
 Mercedes-Benz 300 SL were classified separately from others in D Production at Watkins Glen.
 An unrestricted class was also run, and was won by John Plaisted in a Cheetah-Cadillac.
 Separate Porsche and MG winners were declared in F Production at Hagerstown.
 An unrestricted class was also run, and was won by Terry Hall in a Talbot Grand Prix car.

Champions

External links
World Sports Racing Prototypes: SCCA 1955
Racing Sports Cars: SCCA archive
Etceterini: 1955 program covers

SCCA National Sports Car Championship
Scca National Sports Car Championship
1955 in American motorsport